The Death of Cool is the third studio album from British alternative rock band Kitchens of Distinction, released on 3 August 1992 in the UK by One Little Indian Records and a day later in the US by A&M Records. The album is the follow-up to 1991's Strange Free World and was once again produced by Hugh Jones. While considered by most fans to be their strongest effort, the album was largely ignored by the general public in the midst of the popularity of grunge rock in 1992, peaking at number 72 on the UK Albums Chart. AllMusic critic Ned Raggett praises the album as a "multifaceted, deeply felt hour of music that is easily the equal of such similar masterpieces of post-punk guitar rock as The Chameleons' Script of the Bridge and The Sound's Heads and Hearts." Lead singer Patrick Fitzgerald said this of the album:

Track listing

Singles
"Breathing Fear" (May 1992)
 CD and 12" single:
 "Breathing Fear"
 "Goodbye Voyager"
 "Skin"
 "Airshifting"
 7" single:
 "Breathing Fear"
 "Goodbye Voyager"
"When in Heaven" (August 1992)
 "When in Heaven"
 "Glittery Dust"
 "Don't Come Back"
 "Spacedolphins"

Personnel
Kitchens of Distinction 
 Patrick Fitzgerald – vocals, bass
 Julian Swales – guitar, vocals
 Dan Goodwin – drums, percussion
with:
 Katie Meehan – vocals on "4 Men"
 Caroline Lavelle – cello on "Breathing Fear"
 Tim Sanders – soprano saxophone on "Can't Trust the Waves"
Technical
 Hugh Jones – producer, engineer, percussion on "Gone World Gone"
 John Cornfield – assistant engineer
 Dylan Spalding – tape operator
 Helen Woodward – mixing engineer
 Simon Van Zwanenberg – assistant mixing engineer
 Colin Bell – photography
 Brent Linley – backgrounds
 Sleeve design by Cactus
 Mixed at The Roundhouse, London
 Mastered at Tape One

External links
 [ Allmusic's review of "Breathing Fear" single]

References

Kitchens of Distinction albums
1992 albums
Albums produced by Hugh Jones (producer)
One Little Independent Records albums